Shahram Nazeri (born 18 February 1950) is a contemporary Iranian tenor of Kurdish origin from Kermanshah, Iran, who sings Sufi music, classical and traditional Kurdish and Persian music. He has been accompanied by some of the masters of Iranian traditional music such as Jalil Shahnaz, Hossein Alizadeh, Jalal Zolfonoun, Parviz Meshkatian and Faramarz Payvar. He has also worked with his son Hafez, a composer.

Nazeri was the first musician to include Rumi's poetry within Persian music, thus establishing a tradition of Sufi music within both Persian classical music and Kurdish music. The Christian Science Monitor has called him "Iran's Pavarotti".

Career 
Shahram Nazeri has been established as a significant artist in Iran since the 1970s. His first albums which were in the form of mutual albums with Mohammad-Reza Shajarian, were published by the Chavoush institute by the end of the late 1970s. The content of these albums were filled with liberalism and patriotic ideas.

Nazeri has released over forty recordings to date. His 1984 album The One Hundred-Petalled Rose (Gol-e Sadbarg) has held the record for the highest selling album of Persian classical music and Sufi music in history. His musical talents were first nurtured by his mother at a very young age. Throughout his childhood, he was under the tutelage of the most renowned masters of Persian music including Abdollah Davami, Nourali Boroumand, and Mahmood Karimi. At eleven, he performed on the national Iranian television live for the first time. By age 29, he had gained a loyal fan base. He has continued to perform in Iran and abroad over the course of the last two decades. He has performed at major venues worldwide, including The festival of Avignon, Theâtre de la Ville in Paris and The Tokyo Summer festival.

At his concert in Kermanshah in 2014, he performed a Kurdish song containing the lyrics: "I am from Kermanshah, I don’t speak Persian," prompting condemnation from Iranian authorities, and accusations of Kurdish nationalism.

Albums 

 Chavosh (1978)
Seda Sokhan Eshgh (1979)
Bad Sadah 
Nowrouz (1981)
Gol-e Sadbarg (1984)
Yadegar-e Doust (1984)
Kish (1986)
ShourAngiz (1988)
Saqinameh 2 (1988)
Aatashi in Neyestan (1988) 
Dele Sheida (1988)
Layla and Majnun (1989)
Laleh Bahar (1990)
Dar Golestaneh (1996)
Shour Angiz (1996)
Mystified: Poetry of Rumi (1997)
Song of Myths (2000)
Ghame Ziba (2003)
Lulian (2005)
Shahram Nazeri and the Dastan Group (2006)
Voice of Endearment (2007)
The Passion of Rumi (2007)
Safar Asrat (2009) 
Bi Gharaar (2010)
Molaviyeh (2011)
Shahram Nazeri Live in Concert (2012)
Az Sedaye Sokhan-E Eshgh (2013)
Arash Kamangir (2019)
Through Eternity (2019)
Ey Del Be Kooyeh Eghsh (2019)

Awards 

 Chevalier des Arts et Lettres, by France, 2007.
 Lifetime Cultural Heritage Award, by Asia Society, in 2007.
 Simorgh award, by the International Institute for Dialogue among Cultures and Civilizations, 2007.
 Hafez Film Awards for Best Original Song, Hafez Film Awards, 2015.

Gallery

See also
Aref Ensemble
Dastan Ensemble
The Kamkars
Shams Ensemble

References

External links

 Shahram Nazeri's official website
 [ Shahram Nazeri] at Allmusic
Shahram Nazeri's performance at 800th anniversary of Rumi (BBC Persian)

1950 births
Living people
Music educators
Kurdish musicians
Grammy Award winners
Kurdish male singers
Kurdish male artists
Iranian male singers
Iranian folk singers
Iranian humanitarians
Iranian Kurdish people
People from Kermanshah
Persian-language singers
Kurdish-language singers
Iranian classical singers
Musicians from Kermanshah
Singers awarded knighthoods
20th-century Iranian people
21st-century Iranian people
Persian classical musicians
20th-century Iranian male singers
21st-century Iranian male singers
Recipients of the Legion of Honour
Chevaliers of the Ordre des Arts et des Lettres